Scott Michael Campbell (born August 14, 1971) is an American actor, writer, producer and director. Campbell is best known from his roles in Brokeback Mountain, Push and Flight of the Phoenix. Among the roles he has played (many of them as a guest star in TV shows), there are recurring appearances in ER, Nothing Sacred, House, and Shameless, and the Apple TV+ original science fiction space drama series For All Mankind.

Early life
Campbell was born August 14, 1971 in Missoula, Montana. He graduated from American Academy of Dramatic Arts (Pasadena, California) in 1991.

Career

1992–present: guest starring
His first onscreen appearance was on the television series The Torkelsons in 1992, where he played a jock. He appeared in small roles before appearing as a guest star in Sisters in 1993 where he played Conifer in the episode "Demons". He continued to make small appearances on television shows and movies before making his big screen debut as Billy in the George Lucas produced Radioland Murders in 1994. Campbell appeared in four episodes of Christy from 1994 to 1995. Campbell continued his work in television with a multi-episode arc as EMT Riley Brown on the hit NBC drama, ER.

This was followed up with more small roles in shows like Frasier, Chicago Hope and The West Wing. He was cast as a series regular for the show Nothing Sacred, but the show only lasted one season, and the five remaining episodes were never aired. Campbell later appeared in the 2004 remake of Flight of the Phoenix with Dennis Quaid, Giovanni Ribisi, the Oscar-nominated Brokeback Mountain (2005), as well as the superhero flick Push (2009) with Dakota Fanning.

Campbell continued to work in television with bit roles in 24, House M.D., Grey's Anatomy and Criminal Minds. In 2010, he played a recurring role as Justin Murphy on The Event. In 2013, he appeared in the film A Good Day to Die Hard starring Bruce Willis and Jai Courtney. He starred in The Marriage Pact, and continued with guest starring on multiple shows, such as Resurrection, Wayward Pines and NCIS: New Orleans. Campbell guest starred in the fifth season mid-season finale of Suits where he played Father Sam Walker.

2009–2011: producing and directing
Campbell has produced and directed several short films, the first in 2009 with Waiting for Jevetta which he co-directed and produced with Judith Benezra. In 2010 he produced the short film The Riverside Shuffle. In 2011, Campbell co-produced and co-directed the short films Shooting for Tomorrow, Shooting for Something Else and Tomorrow's End. Campbell received multiple awards for the short films Shooting for Tomorrow and Shooting for Something Else, including the categories Best Short Film, Best Short Film and Best Experimental Short. Shooting for Tomorrow won Best Short Film at the Los Angeles Film Festival.

Filmography

Producer

Films

Television

Awards and nominations

References

External links
 
 Scott Michael Campbell – list of acting credits

1971 births
Living people
American male film actors
American male television actors
Writers from Missoula, Montana
Male actors from Montana